is a tram station located in Toshima, Tokyo, Japan. On maps, it is marked as an interchange with the Toei Mita Line at Nishi-sugamo Station.

Lines 
Toei
Tokyo Sakura Tram

External links
 Toden Shin-Kōshinzuka Station

Railway stations in Tokyo